Orthomegas similis is a species of longhorn beetle belonging to the family Cerambycidae. It is found in south-eastern Brazil and possibly Ecuador and Peru.

Description

References

 Biolib
 Global species
 F. Vitali similis Cerambycoidea

External links
 Callipogon similis on Flickr

Beetles described in 1894
Beetles of South America
Prioninae
Taxa named by Charles Joseph Gahan